Gerard Mark Leishman (born 25 May 1956) is a New Zealand radio and television broadcaster. He was the breakfast host on the Magic radio network. from 15 April 2015 to 9 December 2022 and is also news editor and presenter of The Daily Report, an agribusiness news show on Country TV. He also hosts a half hour long form interview series called Point of View on Country TV.

Career
Leishman has been the producer and presenter of numerous television series, among them Top Town, Tux Wonder Dogs, Jeopardy!, The Great New Zealand Spelling Bee, Mud and Glory, and for 16 years host and co-producer (with his wife Jo Raymond) of The FMG Young Farmer Contest. He has also produced and directed a number of television documentaries, Many of his appearances on screen have been as presenter of entertainment shows and sports broadcasts. He was co-host of Holden Golf World on Sky Sport 1 with Laura McGoldrick. He was the first announcer on the Magic Breakfast radio show, which went first went to air on 15 April 2015 on the Magic radio network. and hosted his final show on 9 December 2022.  He had previously presented the afternoon drive show (2006-2015) on The Breeze radio network. 

In 2017, Leishman was presented with a Scroll of Honour from the Variety Artists Club of New Zealand for his contribution to the New Zealand entertainment industry.

Mark Leishman Programme List
 1981 - 1984	TV One Continuity TVNZ
 1985 - 1987	Today Tonight
 1986 - 1989	Telequest   (Talent Show Live)
 1986 - 1989	Top Town
 1988		Round Australia Yacht Race  Peter Blake
 1988 - 1989	That’s Fairly Interesting
 1988	    This Week in Brisbane (Expo)
 1990		Auckland Commonwealth Games (reporter)
 1990 - 1991	Mud n Glory 
 1992 - 1993	ONE World of Sport (Rugby NZs Big Game)
 1992		Jeopardy (120 episodes)
 1992 		This Week in San Diego (America’s Cup)
 1992 		The Paradise Picture Show
 1993 - 1999	Tux Wonder Dogs &  2004 - 2005 (series 8 - 9)  D
 1999		Battle of the Ballroom 			D
 2000		Tux Super Dogs Challenge		D
 2005 - 2006	The Golf Club 
 2001 - 2016	Young Farmer Contest			D
 2003		Life in Pacifica  (travel series for Travel Channel USA)
 2004		The Road to Athens (Olympics)
 2005		A Dog’s Life 				D
 2006		The Great NZ Spelling Bee
 2008 - 2010	Jim’s Car Show 
 2010 - 2013	Road to the Young Farmer 		D
 2013 - 2016	Holden Golf World
 2008 - 2022 Country TV (news presenter / producer)
 2014 - 2022 Point of View (Agri Interview Show )

Documentaries all for Dexterity   			D
 A Friend For Life
 Kohi: A Guide To Life
 Coming Out of the Dark
 Reaching For The Stars
 A Different Beat - A Police Dog Story

Communicado  Inflight Entertainment for Continental Airlines

Personal life
Leishman married Jo Raymond, at Sacred Heart Basilica, Timaru, on 15 December 1990, and the couple have three children. Leishman's brother Phillip (1951–2013) was also a well-known New Zealand television broadcaster.

See also
 List of New Zealand television personalities

References

1956 births
Living people
New Zealand television presenters
New Zealand radio presenters
Magic (radio network)